Eois coerulea is a moth in the family Geometridae. It is found in Argentina.

References

Moths described in 1905
Eois
Moths of South America